Harold Kenneth Gerhart (born May 19, 1961), is a retired Major League Baseball player who was an outfielder from 1986-1988 for the Baltimore Orioles. His career came to an abrupt ending when he was struck in the wrist while batting. He now lives with his family in Murfreesboro, Tennessee.

Career
Gerhart graduated from MTSU and was drafted by the Baltimore Orioles in 1982 during the 5th round of the amateur draft. Being drafted in 1982, he spent four years in the minors, and debuted against the Detroit Tigers in 1986. After two years of playing, he got injured while batting when he was hit by a pitch in the wrist. The injury ended his major league career.

He holds the single season runs scored record for the Hagerstown Suns minor league baseball team with 131 runs scored in 1983.  He is also the Suns career leader in runs scored with 170 (tied with Don Buford).

External links

1961 births
Major League Baseball outfielders
Baseball players from South Carolina
Baltimore Orioles players
Hagerstown Suns players
Colorado Springs Sky Sox players
Living people
Middle Tennessee Blue Raiders baseball players
Bluefield Orioles players
Charlotte Knights players
Phoenix Firebirds players
Rochester Red Wings players
Shreveport Captains players